Gary Kaplan (born January 5, 1959 in New York) is the founder of BetonSports.com (BoS), an online sports betting company which took in wagers amounting to nearly $4 billion from 2002 and 2004, 98 percent of which came from the United States. In 2004, BoS went public on the London Stock Exchange.

Early life and career
Kaplan was raised in Brooklyn, New York and dropped out of high school. He is of Jewish descent. In 1993, after he moving from New York to South Florida, he noticed how bookies would fly to the Caribbean where gambling was legal to place bets for American bettors. 

Soon after, he founded his own sports book doing the same. In 1995, he moved to San José, Costa Rica where he met Norm "Stormin' Norman" Steinberg, operator of the Millennium Sportsbook. A consummate gambler, Steinberg lost heavily and settled his obligations to Kaplan, gave up his extensive customer list. 

Instead of relying on word-of-mouth to obtain customers, the norm in the industry, Kaplan implemented an extensive marketing campaign buying full-page ads in mainstream publications including Maxim magazine and Pro Football Weekly, on sports radio such as The Jim Rome Show, leased billboards, and sent out promotional mail. He created 100s of websites as gamblers were superstitious often not returning to a website where they lost money. The business was so successful that his sister, Lori Kaplan Multz, and brother, Neil Kaplan, soon joined him in Costa Rica. 

BoS booked $1.09 billion in bets in 2001 increasing to $1.23 billion in 2002, and $1.24 billion 2003. In 2000, he hired British citizen David Carruthers as CEO and after initially failing to float the company on the London Stock Exchange, they were successful in  July 2004. 

On July 17, 2006 the United States Attorney for the Eastern District of Missouri office, citing the Federal Wire Act of 1961, which prohibits the use of a wire communication facility to transmit bets across state or foreign borders, issued a 22 count indictment for Gary Kaplan and eight others, including David Carruthers. Other violations noted in the indictment included Racketeer Influenced and Corrupt Organizations Act, interstate transportation of gambling paraphernalia, interference with the administration of Internal Revenue Service laws and tax evasion.  Nine months later he was arrested in the Dominican Republic and Interpol transferred him to U.S. custody.

Kaplan retained attorneys Alan Dershowitz, Chris Flood, and Dick DeGuerin. In April 2009, Carruthers reached a plea bargain with prosecutors in exchange for a reduced sentence. Carruthers has agreed to cooperate with authorities and testify against Kaplan and others still facing charges.

In August 2009, Kaplan reached a plea deal with authorities. He has been sentenced to 4 years in jail.

Personal life 
Kaplan is married to Holly Hoeffner and they have two children.

See also
David Carruthers
Jay Cohen
Peter Dicks
Neteller
Nigel Payne
Safe Port Act

References

Living people
1959 births
American casino industry businesspeople
American people of Jewish descent